Wells County Courthouse may refer to:

Wells County Courthouse (Indiana), Bluffton, Indiana
Wells County Courthouse (North Dakota), Fessenden, North Dakota